Joseph E. Tregoning (May 26, 1941 – October 10, 2019) was an American politician who served as a member of the Wisconsin State Assembly.

Biography
Tregoning was born in May 1941 in Shullsburg, Wisconsin. He was married with one child and was a member of the Full Gospel Business Men's Fellowship International. Tregoning died in October 2019 at the age of 78.

Political career
Tregoning was first elected to the Assembly in a special election in 1967. Additionally, he was Chairman of the Lafayette County, Wisconsin Republican Party from 1964 to 1967.

References

External links

1941 births
2019 deaths
Burials in Wisconsin
Republican Party members of the Wisconsin State Assembly
People from Shullsburg, Wisconsin